The Risle (less common: Rille) is a  long river in Normandy, left tributary of the Seine.

The river begins in the Orne department west of L'Aigle, crosses the western part of the department of Eure flowing from south to north and out into the estuary of the Seine on the left bank near Berville-sur-Mer.  Its upper valley is part of the Pays d'Ouche, its lower valley separates the regions of the Lieuvin and Roumois.

The Risle is regarded as a coastal river. Fishing is common downstream at Pont-Audemer.

On July 30, 2012, the Risle vanished in a ponor between La Ferrière-sur-Risle and La Houssaye.

Its only major tributary is the Charentonne. The Risle flows through the following departments and communes:

Orne: Sainte-Gauburge-Sainte-Colombe, L'Aigle
Eure: Rugles, Beaumont-le-Roger, Brionne, Montfort-sur-Risle, Pont-Audemer

References

Rivers of France
Rivers of Orne
Rivers of Eure
Rivers of Normandy